Minoru Okita (born 1 July 1951) is a sailor from Japan, who represented his country at the 1984 Summer Olympics in Los Angeles, United States as crew member in the Soling. With helmsman Takaharu Hirozawa and fellow crew member Takumi Fujiwara they took the 16th place.

References

Living people
1951 births
Sailors at the 1984 Summer Olympics – Soling
Olympic sailors of Japan
Japanese male sailors (sport)